Kurdalagonus is a genus of cetotheriid mysticete in the subfamily Cetotheriinae from the Miocene of the Russian Caucasus.

"Kurdalagonus" adygeicus has been reassigned to Mithridatocetus, while the referral of "Cetotherium" maicopicum to Kurdalagonus has been questioned.

References 

Baleen whales
Miocene cetaceans
Prehistoric cetacean genera
Fossil taxa described in 2012
Miocene mammals of Europe